Tivoli is a 19th-century painting by American artist Sanford Robinson Gifford. Done in oil on canvas, the work depicts a sunlit day in the town of Tivoli in Italy. The view of the town, the Aniene River, and surrounding valley was described by Gifford as “one of the finest views in the world”. The painting, which is in the collection of the Metropolitan Museum of Art, was produced for noted New York art collector Robert Gordon.

References 

1870 paintings
American paintings
Paintings in the collection of the Metropolitan Museum of Art